There are multiple individuals named "Arsala Khan":

 Arsala Khan (member of Pakistani legislature)
 Wazir Arsala Khan, 19th Century foreign minister of Afghanistan
 Chak-e-Arsala Khan, Kashmir, a town in the disputed region of Kashmir